George J. Tamaro is an American civil engineer.

He graduated in 1961 with a master's degree in civil engineering at the P.C. Rossin College of Engineering and Applied Science.

He is the 2005 recipient of the John Fritz Medal awarded by the American Association of Engineering Societies.

References 

Living people
Year of birth missing (living people)
Place of birth missing (living people)
John Fritz Medal recipients
Lehigh University alumni